The 1994 Skoda Czech Open was a men's tennis tournament played on Clay in Prague, Czech Republic that was part of the International Series of the 1994 ATP Tour.
Hendrik Jan Davids and Libor Pimek were the defending champions, but Davids did not compete this year. Pimek teamed up with Francisco Roig and lost in the semifinals to Tomáš Krupa and Pavel Vízner.

Karel Nováček and Mats Wilander won the title after their opponents, Krupa and Vízner, were forced to withdraw before the final match.

Seeds

Draw

Draw

References

External links
 Official results archive (ATP)
 Official results archive (ITF)

Prague Open (1987–1999)
1994 ATP Tour